= Acer Liquid E1 =

- Manufacturer: Acer
- Type: Smartphone
- First released: March 2013
- Compatible networks: GSM / HSPA
- Form factor: Slate
- Colors: Black, White
- Dimensions: 132 mm (5.2 in) H 68.4 mm (2.69 in) W 9.9 mm (0.39 in) D
- Weight: 130 g (4.6 oz)
- Operating system: Android 4.1.1 (Jelly Bean)
- System-on-chip: MediaTek MT6577
- CPU: 1.0 GHz Dual-core Cortex-A9
- GPU: PowerVR SGX 531
- Memory: 1 GB RAM
- Storage: 4 GB
- Removable storage: microSD, up to 32 GB
- SIM: Single SIM or Dual SIM (Acer Liquid E1 Duo)
- Battery: 1760 mAh Li-ion
- Rear camera: 5 MP (2592x1944 px), autofocus, LED flash, 720p video at 30 fps
- Front camera: 0.3 MP
- Display: 4.5 in (110 mm) IPS LCD touchscreen (540 x 960 px, 245 ppi)

The Acer Liquid E1 is an Android smartphone announced in January 2013 by Acer. Unveiled on February 25 at MWC 2013, the smartphone became available in March running Android 4.1.1 (Jelly Bean). A dual SIM variant is also available, marketed as the Acer Liquid E1 Duo. The device was released in black and white color options.

== Hardware ==
=== Design and Display ===
The Acer Liquid E1 features a 4.5-inch IPS LCD touchscreen with a resolution of 540 by 960 pixels, resulting in a pixel density of 245 ppi. The device is equipped with four built-in speakers.

=== Performance and Storage ===
Under the hood, the smartphone runs on a MediaTek MT6577 chipset housing a dual-core 1.0 GHz Cortex-A9 processor and a PowerVR SGX 531 GPU. It includes 1 GB of RAM and 4 GB of internal storage, which can be expanded up to 32 GB via a microSD card slot.

=== Battery ===
The device is powered by a 1,760 mAh removable battery, providing up to 400 hours of standby time and 8 hours of talk time.

=== Cameras ===
The Acer Liquid E1 is equipped with dual cameras. The primary rear camera features a 5 MP sensor (2592x1944 px) with autofocus and an LED flash, capable of recording 720p video at 30 fps. The secondary front-facing camera features a 0.3 MP sensor.

== Software ==
The smartphone ships with Android 4.1.1 (Jelly Bean) out of the box.
